This is a list of notable Sundanese people.

Activists
Dewi Sartika, Indonesian female activist in the Dutch colonial era, Indonesian national hero
Oto Iskandar di Nata, Indonesian nationalist activist in the Dutch colonial era, Indonesian national hero, State Minister of Indonesia

Artists
Elfa Secioria
Erwin Gutawa, composer (half-Malay)
Addie MS, composer
Asep Sunandar Sunarya, Sundanese wayang golek (rod puppet) master

Athletes
Abdul Aziz Lutfi Akbar, footballer
Asep Berlian, footballer
Atep Rizal, footballer
Cahya Supriadi, footballer
Cecep Supriatna, footballer
Dedi Kusnandar, footballer
Dicky Indrayana, footballer
Djadjang Nurdjaman, footballer
Eka Ramdani, footballer
Febri Hariyadi, footballer
Henhen Herdiana, footballer
Jajang Mulyana, footballer
Jajang Sukmara, footballer
Ricky Subagja, badminton player
Robby Darwis, footballer
Ryan Kurnia, footballer
Saepulloh Maulana, footballer
Shahar Ginanjar, footballer
Taufik Hidayat, badminton player, 2004 Olympic gold medalist
Wawan Hendrawan, footballer
Yandi Sofyan, footballer
Zaenal Arif, footballer

Authors
Achdiat Karta Mihardja, writer
Ajip Rosidi, Indonesian poet and short story writer

Businesspeople
Betti Alisjahbana, former CEO of IBM Indonesia

Diplomats
Ali Alatas, former minister of foreign affairs of Indonesia (half-Arab)
Hassan Wirajuda, former minister of foreign affairs of Indonesia
Marty Natalegawa, former minister of foreign affairs of Indonesia
Mochtar Kusumaatmadja, former minister of foreign affairs of Indonesia

Entertainers
Adhisty Zara, actress, singer, ex member of JKT48
Kevin Liliana, actress, model, Winner of Miss International 2017
Raffi Ahmad, actor, presenter
Rianti Cartwright, actress, model, presenter and VJ (half- Welsh)
Elvy Sukaesih, Dangdut singer
Evie Tamala, Dangdut singer
Melly Goeslaw, singer-songwriter (half Mollucans)
Gita Gutawa, soprano singer (one quarter Malays)
Happy Salma, actress, writer, model; became a princess and member of the Lordship of Ubud after marriage
Ikke Nurjanah, actress, singer
Isyana Sarasvati, singer, actress
Jamie Aditya, TV host, actor, entertainer (half-Australian)
Jojon, comedian
Ebet Kadarusman, radio and TV host, talk show entertainer
Kamidia Radisti, presenter, Miss Indonesia World 2007
Iwa Kusuma, rapper
Asyifa Latief, presenter. Miss Indonesia World 2010 (half-Arabs)
Mulan Jameela, singer
Nike Ardila, singer
Nining Meida, Sundanese campursari singer
Vina Panduwinata, singer
Nia Ramadhani, actress (half-Dutch)
Rhoma Irama, Dangdut singer, actor
Harry Roesli, rock singer, musician
Rossa, pop and R&B singer
Dira Sugandi, jazz and soul singer
Sule, comedian
Poppy Mercury, singer

Filmmakers
Aris Nugraha, film director
Nia Dinata, film director

Politicians
Anies Baswedan, governor of Jakarta (half Arab and half Javanese ancestry)
Armida Alisjahbana, Indonesian minister
Amirmachmud, chairman of the People's Consultative Assembly
Agum Gumelar, former Indonesian government minister
Ahmad Heryawan, former governor of West Java
Ridwan Kamil, governor of West Java
Ginandjar Kartasasmita, former Indonesian government minister
Ma'ruf Amin, Vice President
Djuanda Kartawidjaja,  11th Prime Minister of Indonesia
Dada Rosada, former mayor of Bandung
Ali Sadikin, former governor of Jakarta 
Suharna Surapranata, Indonesian minister 
Soekaesih, colonial era activist and political prisoner
Ateng Wahyudi, former mayor of Bandung 
Umar Wirahadikusumah, former Indonesian vice president
Rachmat Witoelar, former Indonesian government minister
Ahmad Heryawan, governor of West Java
Dadang M. Naser, regent of Bandung Regency
Iti Octavia Jayabaya, regent of Pandeglang Regency
Ade Yasin, former regent of Bogor Regency

See also

List of Acehnese people
List of Batak people
List of Bugis people
List of Chinese Indonesians
List of Javanese people
List of Minangkabau people
List of Moluccan people
Sundanese people

References

Sundanese
 
Sundanese